Hyloxalus saltuarius is a species of frogs in the family Dendrobatidae. It is endemic to Colombia where it is only known from the Cordillera Oriental in the Caquetá Department.
Its natural habitats are premontane humid forests. It lives on the forest floor.

References

saltuarius
Endemic fauna of Colombia
Amphibians of Colombia
Amphibians of the Andes
Frogs of South America
Amphibians described in 2002
Taxonomy articles created by Polbot